Oahu (Hawaiian: Oʻahu), also known as "The Gathering Place", is the third-largest of the Hawaiian Islands. It is home to roughly one million people—over two-thirds of the population of the U.S. state of Hawaii. The island of O’ahu and the Northwestern Hawaiian Islands constitute the City and County of Honolulu. The state capital, Honolulu, is on Oʻahu's southeast coast. Oʻahu had a population of 1,016,508 according to the 2020 U.S. Census, up from 953,207 in 2010 (approximately 70% of the total 1,455,271 population of the State of Hawaii, with approximately 81% of those living in or near the Honolulu urban area).

Name

The Island of Oahu in Hawaii is often nicknamed (or translated as) "The Gathering Place". It appears that Oahu grew into this nickname; it is now the most populous Hawaiian Island, but in ancient times was not populous and was outranked by the status of other islands. The translation of "gathering place" was suggested as recently as 1922 by Hawaiian Almanac author Thomas Thrum. It has been speculated that Thrum ignored or misplaced the okina because the Hawaiian phrase "o ahu" could be translated as "gathering of objects" (o is a subject marker and ahu means "to gather"). The term  has no confirmed meaning in Hawaiian, other than that of the place itself.

The city of Honolulu—largest city, the state capital, and main deepwater marine port for the State of —is here. As a jurisdictional unit, the entire island of Oʻahu is in Honolulu County, although as a place name, Honolulu occupies only part of the southeastern end of the island.

Well-known features of Oʻahu include Waikiki, Pearl Harbor, Diamond Head, Kāneʻohe Bay, Kailua Bay, North Shore, and the resort destination Ko Olina.

While the island is designated the City and County of Honolulu, excluding the minor Northwestern Hawaiian Islands, residents identify settlements using town names (generally those of the census-designated places), and consider the island divided into various areas that may overlap. These terms are somewhat flexible, depending on the area in which the user lives, and are used in a general way, but residents of each area identify strongly with their part of the island, especially those outside of widely known towns. For instance, if asked where they live, a local would usually reply "Windward Side" rather than "Kailua".

History 

The island has been inhabited since at least the 3rd century A.D. The 304-year-old Kingdom of Oʻahu was once ruled by the most ancient aliʻi in all of the Hawaiian Islands. The first great king of Oʻahu was Maʻilikūkahi, the lawmaker, who was followed by many generations of monarchs. Kualiʻi was the first of the warlike kings and was succeeded by his sons. In 1773, the throne fell upon Kahahana, the son of Elani of Ewa. In 1783, Kahekili II, King of Maui, conquered Oʻahu, deposed the reigning family, and made his son, Kalanikūpule, king of O'ahu, turning O'ahu into a puppet state. Kamehameha the Great conquered Kalanikūpule's forces in the Battle of Nuʻuanu. Kamehameha founded the Kingdom of Hawaiʻi with the conquest of Oʻahu in 1795. Hawaiʻi was not unified until the islands of Kauaʻi and Niʻihau surrendered under King Kaumualiʻi in 1810. Kamehameha III moved his capital from Lāhainā, Maui to Honolulu, Oʻahu in 1845. ʻIolani Palace, built later by other members of the royal family, still stands, and is the only royal palace on American soil.

Oʻahu was apparently the first of the Hawaiian Islands sighted by the crew of HMS Resolution on January 19, 1778, during Captain James Cook's third Pacific expedition. Escorted by HMS Discovery, the expedition was surprised to find high islands this far north in the central Pacific. Oʻahu was not actually visited by Europeans until February 28, 1779, when Captain Charles Clerke aboard HMS Resolution stepped ashore at Waimea Bay. Clerke took command of the ship after James Cook was killed at Kealakekua Bay (island of Hawaiʻi) on February 14, and was leaving the islands for the North Pacific. With the discovery of the Hawaiian Islands came the introduction of disease, mosquitoes, and aggressive foreign animals. Although indirect, simple exposure to these foreign species caused permanent damage to the Native Hawaiian people and environment.

The Imperial Japanese Navy's attack on Pearl Harbor, Oʻahu on the morning of December 7, 1941, brought the United States into World War II. The surprise attack was aimed at destroying the American will fight and making them sue for peace immediately by attacking the Pacific Fleet of the United States Navy and its defending Army Air Forces and Marine Air Forces. The attack damaged or destroyed 12 American warships, destroyed 188 aircraft, and resulted in the deaths of 2,335 American servicemen and 68 civilians (of those, 1,177 were the result of the destruction of the USS Arizona alone).

Today, Oʻahu has become a tourism and shopping haven. Over five million visitors (mainly from the contiguous United States and Japan) flock there every year.

Climate

Oʻahu is also known for having the longest rain shower in history, which lasted 200 consecutive days. Kāneʻohe Ranch reported 247 straight days of rain from August 27, 1993, to April 30, 1994. The island is the warmest from June through October.

Geography  
The windward side is known for some of the world's most beautiful beaches. Beach on the windward coast has been consistently ranked among the world's best beaches. The island is composed of two separate shield volcanoes: the Waiʻanae and Koʻolau Ranges, with a broad valley or saddle (the central Oʻahu Plain) between them.

Being roughly diamond-shaped, surrounded by ocean, and divided by mountain ranges, directions on Oʻahu are not generally described with compass directions. Locals instead use directions with Honolulu as the central point. To go  means toward the western tip of the island, "Diamond Head" is toward the eastern tip,  is inland (toward the central  Mountain range, north of Honolulu) and  toward the sea. When these directions became common, Diamond Head was the eastern edge of the primary populated area. Today, with a much larger populace and extensive development, the mountain is often not actually to the east when directions are given, and is not to be used as a literal point of reference—to go "Diamond Head" is to go to the east from anywhere on the island.

Tourist attractions

Top beaches 
 Ala Moana Beach
 Hanauma Bay
 Kāneʻohe Bay
 Ko Olina Beach Park
 Kailua
 Lanikai Beach
 Papailoa Beach
 Sandy Beach
 Sunset Beach
 Waikīkī Beach
 Waimānalo Beach
 Waimea Bay

Attractions 
 Ala Moana
 Aloha Tower
 Aulani, a Disney Resort & Spa
 Banzai Pipeline
 Bishop Museum
 Diamond Head
 Dole Plantation
 Foster Botanical Garden
 Kaʻena Point
 Honolulu
 Honolulu Museum of Art
 Hoʻomaluhia Botanical Garden
 ʻIolani Palace
 Kualoa Ranch
 Lāʻie Hawaii Temple
 Nuʻuanu Pali Lookout
 Mauna ʻAla
 Makapuu Lighthouse
 National Memorial Cemetery of the Pacific or "Punchbowl"
 North Shore
 Pali Lookout
 Pearl Harbor
 Polynesian Cultural Center
 Triple Crown of Surfing
 USS Arizona Memorial
 USS Missouri
 Valley of the Temples Memorial Park
 Waikīkī
 Waikīkī Aquarium
 Waimea Valley Audubon Center
 Waimea Valley

In popular culture
 In the video games Test Drive Unlimited and Test Drive Unlimited 2 players can drive around O'ahu island's  of road. Later, the island will also featured in The Crew Motorfest.
 Microsoft Flight, released in 2012 as the successor to the Microsoft Flight Simulator series, was set on island of Hawaiʻi. The game had a piece of downloadable content (DLC) called Hawaiian Adventure Pack. Once purchased, it brought detail to all of the Hawaiian islands to the game, including Oʻahu. The DLC also brought new airports to land and take off from and new missions to complete, among other things. 
 Lost was filmed almost entirely on Oʻahu, with many locations on the island (predominantly Honolulu) serving as a stand-in for other locations (including the US, Australia, UK, and South Korea). Many of the show's stars still call the island home. The island's thick rainforests and picturesque beaches are prominently featured.
 50 First Dates, a movie that takes place on the island.
 MythBusters shot their 2012 Season's "Duct Tape Island" episode on this island
 The South Korean reality TV series Father and Me was filmed on Oʻahu in 2016
 The Reimanns, a popular German reality TV series, has been filmed on the North Shore at the family's estate in Pūpūkea since December 2015.

Beginning with a contract with the US Navy in 2001, Ocean Power Technologies began ocean-testing Azura, its wave power generation system at the Marine Corps Base Hawaii (MCBH) at Kāneʻohe Bay. The Oʻahu system was launched under the company's program with the US Navy for ocean testing and demonstration of such systems, including connection to the Oʻahu grid. The prototype can produce 20 kW, a system with 500 kW to 1 MW is planned to be installed at end of 2017.

Oʻahu has 343 MW of rooftop solar power, and potential for 92 MW of wind power.

Notable people

 Barack Obama, 44th President of the United States
 Benny Agbayani, professional baseball player
 Keiko Agena, actor
 Gabe Baltazar, clarinet and saxophone player
 Alexandria Boehm, scientist
 Darren Brooks, actor, writer, producer
 Max Holloway, MMA Fighter, Former UFC Featherweight Champion
 Angelique Cabral, actor
 Tia Carrere, actor
 Brian Ching, Major League Soccer
 Dennis Chun, actor (Hawaii Five-0), son of Kam Fong
 Bryan Clay, Olympic decathlete 2008
 Scott Crary, film director and producer
 Auliʻi Cravalho, actor, singer
 Mark Dacascos, actor
 Caitlin Doughty, mortician, author and YouTube personality
 Diana Ewing, actor
 Sid Fernandez, baseball
 Maile Flanagan, actor
 Kam Fong, actor
 Lauren Graham, actor
 Erin Gray, actor
 Brian Grazer, Oscar-winning film and television producer

 Coco Ho, pro surfer
 Don Ho, singer
 Kelly Ann Hu, actor
 Carrie Ann Inaba, dancer, actor, musician
 Daniel Inouye, US Senator, Medal of Honor recipient
 Jack Johnson, musician, folk-rock singer-songwriter
 Duke Kahanamoku, pro swimmer, surfer, sheriff
 Samuel Kamakau, historian
 Israel Kamakawiwo'ole, musician

 Maxim Knight, actor
 Olin Kreutz, football player Chicago Bears
 Clyde Kusatsu, actor
 Teri Ann Linn, actor
 Jack Lord, actor 
 Marcus Mariota, NFL football player, Atlanta Falcons
 Markiplier (Mark Edward Fischbach), Internet personality, video game commentator
 Bruno Mars, singer-songwriter, record producer, musician
 Julie McCullough, actor
 Zack Merrick, drummer in American rock band All Time Low
 Bette Midler, singer, actor, comedian
 Jason Momoa, actor
 Carissa Moore, pro surfer
 Tahj Mowry, actor
 Don Muraco, professional wrestler
 Jamie O'Brien, surfer

 Ellison Onizuka, NASA astronaut, STS-51-C, STS-51-L, Space Shuttle Challenger disaster
 Noelani Pantastico, ballet dancer
 Janel Parrish, actor, singer
 Kelly Preston, actor
 Maggie Q, actor
 Jonah Ray, actor, comedian, writer
 Makua Rothman (born 1984), world champion surfer
 Anthony Ruivivar, actor
 Jesse Sapolu, retired football player, San Francisco 49ers
 Garret T. Sato, actor

 Amanda Schull, actor
 James Shigeta, actor
 Jake Shimabukuro, ʻukulele player
 Karen Steele, actor
 Don Stroud, actor

 Tua Tagovailoa, NFL football player, Miami Dolphins
 Ronald Takaki, academic, historian, ethnographer, and author
 Akebono Tarō, sumo wrestler
 Kristi Tauti, professional figure competitor and fitness model
 Manti Te'o, NFL football player, Los Angeles Chargers
 Paul Theroux, author
 Michelle Wie West, golf LPGA
 Taylor Wily, actor
 Kirby Wright, poet and writer

 Keone Young, actor

See also

 Honolulu Volcanics
 National Register of Historic Places listings in Oʻahu

References

Citations

Sources
 Doyle, David W., 2001. Rescue in Paradise: Oahu's Beaches and their Guardians. Island Heritage.
 Macdonald, Gordon A., Agatin T. Abbott, and Frank L. Peterson, 1983. Volcanoes in the Sea. University of Hawaiʻi Press, Honolulu. 517 pp.
 Pukui, M. K., S. H. Elbert, and E. T. Mookini, 1976. Place names of Hawaiʻi. University of Hawaiʻi Press. 289 pp.

External links 
 
 

 
Articles containing video clips
Geography of Honolulu County, Hawaii
Islands of Hawaii